Bradley Mason Holmes (born 16 December 2002) is an English professional footballer who plays as a forward for Hyde United, on loan from Blackpool.

Career
Holmes signed a professional contract with Blackpool in the summer of 2020, and made his first-team debut for the club on 20 April 2021, in a League defeat at Rochdale. He made his first start for the club the following month, in a single-goal League One victory over Bristol Rovers at Bloomfield Road on 9 May.

He joined F.C. United of Manchester on loan on 14 September 2021. As of 5 October, he had scored four goals in six games for the club, including one on his debut.

Holmes went out on loan again, to Chorley, on 22 December 2021.

After a one-month loan spell with AFC Fylde between August and September 2022, on 23 September he joined Hyde United, also on loan, until January 2023.

Career statistics

References

External links
 

2002 births
Living people
English footballers
Association football forwards
Blackpool F.C. players
F.C. United of Manchester players
Chorley F.C. players
AFC Fylde players
Hyde United F.C. players
English Football League players
National League (English football) players
Northern Premier League players